Iolaus farquharsoni, the Farquharson's sapphire, is a butterfly in the family Lycaenidae. It is found in Ghana, southern Nigeria, Cameroon, the Democratic Republic of the Congo, Uganda, north-western Tanzania and north-western Zambia. The habitat consists of open forests and secondary growth.

The larvae feed on the flowers of Loranthus incanus, Globimetula braunii and Globimetula anguliflora. They are green with tiny brown or red dots and closely resemble the flowering cushions of their host plant.

References

Butterflies described in 1922
Iolaus (butterfly)